John Boulicault (June 27, 1906 – July 11, 1985) was an American cyclist. He competed in two events at the 1924 Summer Olympics.

References

External links
 

1906 births
1985 deaths
American male cyclists
Olympic cyclists of the United States
Cyclists at the 1924 Summer Olympics
Sportspeople from St. Louis